Mâcot-la-Plagne is a former commune in the Savoie department in the Auvergne-Rhône-Alpes region in south-eastern France. On 1 January 2016, it was merged into the new commune of La Plagne Tarentaise.

Geography
It gives its name to the French ski resort La Plagne, most of which lies within the commune of Mâcot-la-Plagne. It is bordered by the communes of Aime to the west, Bozel to the southwest, Champagny-en-Vanoise to the south, Bellentre to the east, and Valezan and La Côte-d'Aime to the north

Population

See also
Communes of the Savoie department

References

Former communes of Savoie